Dyasma is a monotypic moth genus in the subfamily Lymantriinae erected by Cyril Leslie Collenette in 1961. Its only species, Dyasma thaumatopoeides, was first described by Schultze in 1934. It is found in the Central African Republic and Uganda.

References

Lymantriinae
Monotypic moth genera